Michael Wolff (born August 27, 1953) is an American journalist, as well as a columnist and contributor to USA Today, The Hollywood Reporter, and the UK edition of GQ. He has received two National Magazine Awards, a Mirror Award, and has authored seven books, including Burn Rate (1998) about his own dot-com company, and The Man Who Owns the News (2008), a biography of Rupert Murdoch.  He co-founded the news aggregation website Newser and is a former editor of Adweek.

On January 5, 2018, Wolff's book Fire and Fury: Inside the Trump White House was published, containing  unflattering descriptions of behavior by U.S. President Donald Trump, chaotic interactions among the White House senior staff, and derogatory comments about the Trump family by former White House Chief Strategist Steve Bannon. The book quickly became a New York Times number-one bestseller and became the first of a trilogy about Trump in power, the other two books being Siege (2019) and Landslide (2021).

Early life
Michael Wolff was born in Paterson, New Jersey, the son of Lewis Allen Wolff (1920–1984), an advertising professional, and Marguerite (Vanderwerf) "Van" Wolff (1925–2012) a reporter for Paterson Evening News. Wolff graduated from Montclair Academy (now Montclair Kimberley Academy) in 1971, where he was student council president in his senior year. He attended Vassar College and transferred to Columbia University, from which he graduated in 1975. While a student at Columbia, he worked for The New York Times as a copy boy.

Career

1970s 
He published his first magazine article in the New York Times Magazine in 1974: a profile of Angela Atwood, a neighbor of his family who helped kidnap Patricia Hearst as a member of the Symbionese Liberation Army. Shortly afterward, he left the Times and became a contributing writer to the New Times, a bi-weekly news magazine started by Jon Larsen and George Hirsch. Wolff's first book was White Kids (1979), a collection of essays.

1990s 
In 1991, Wolff launched Michael Wolff & Company, Inc., specializing in book-packaging. Its first project, Where We Stand, was a book with a companion PBS series. The company's next major project was creating one of the first guides to the Internet, albeit in book form. Net Guide was published by Random House.

In the fall of 1998, Wolff published a book,  Burn Rate, which recounted the details of the financing, positioning, personalities, and ultimate breakdown of Wolff's start-up Internet company, Wolff New Media. The book became a bestseller. In its review of Wolff's book Burn Rate, Brill's Content criticized Wolff for "apparent factual errors" and said that 13 people, including subjects he mentioned, complained that Wolff had "invented or changed quotes".

In August 1998, Wolff was recruited by New York magazine to write a weekly column. Over the next six years, he wrote more than 300 columns  that included criticism of the entrepreneur Steven Brill, the media banker Steven Rattner, and the book publisher Judith Regan.

2000s 

Wolff was nominated for the National Magazine Award three times, winning twice. His second National Magazine Award was for a series of columns he wrote from the media center in the Persian Gulf as the Iraq War started in 2003. His book, Autumn of the Moguls (2004), which predicted the mainstream media crisis that hit later in the decade, was based on many of his New York magazine columns.

In 2004, when New York magazine's owners, Primedia Inc., put the magazine up for sale, Wolff helped assemble a group of investors, including New York Daily News publisher Mortimer Zuckerman, to back him in acquiring the magazine. Although the group believed it had made a successful bid, Primedia decided to sell the magazine to the investment banker Bruce Wasserstein.

In a 2004 cover story for The New Republic, Michelle Cottle wrote that Wolff was "uninterested in the working press," preferring to focus on "the power players—the moguls" and was "fixated on culture, style, buzz, and money, money, money." She also noted that "the scenes in his columns aren’t recreated so much as created—springing from Wolff’s imagination rather than from actual knowledge of events," calling his writing "a whirlwind of flourishes and tangents and asides that often stray so far from the central point that you begin to wonder whether there is a central point."

In 2005, Wolff joined Vanity Fair as its media columnist. In 2007, with Patrick Spain, the founder of Hoover's, and Caroline Miller, the former editor-in-chief of New York magazine, he launched Newser, a news aggregator website.

That year, he also wrote a biography of Rupert Murdoch, The Man Who Owns the News, based on more than 50 hours of conversation with Murdoch and extensive access to his business associates and his family. The book was published in 2008. Beginning in mid-2008, Wolff briefly worked as a weekly columnist for The Industry Standard, an Internet trade magazine published by IDG. David Carr, in a review Business Insider'''s Maxwell Tani described as "scathing" wrote that Wolff was "far less circumspect" than most other journalists.

 2010s 
Wolff received a 2010 Mirror Award in the category Best Commentary: Traditional Media for his work in Vanity Fair.

In 2010, Wolff became editor of the advertising trade publication Adweek. He was asked to step down one year later, amid a disagreement as to "what this magazine should be".

Fire and Fury

In early January 2018, Wolff's book Fire and Fury: Inside the Trump White House was published. Excerpts released before publication included unflattering descriptions of behavior by U.S. President Donald Trump, chaotic interactions among the White House senior staff, and derogatory comments about the Trump family by former White House Chief Strategist Steve Bannon. News of the book's imminent publication and its embarrassing depiction of Trump prompted Trump and his lawyer, Charles Harder, to issue on January 4, 2018 a cease and desist letter alleging false statements, defamation, and malice, and to threaten libel lawsuits against Wolff, his publisher Henry Holt and Company, and Bannon, an action that actually stimulated pre-launch book sales. On January 8, Henry Holt's attorney, Elizabeth McNamara, responded to Harder's allegations with an assurance that no apology or retraction would be forthcoming, while also noting that Harder's complaint cited no specific errors in Wolff's text. John Sargent, the chief executive of Macmillan-Holt, informed the publisher's employees that "as citizens, we must demand that President Trump understand and abide by the First Amendment of our Constitution."

According to other lawyers and a historian, threats of a lawsuit by Trump against a book author and publisher were unprecedented by a sitting president attempting to suppress freedom of speech protected by the U.S. First Amendment. Before its release on January 5, the book and e-book reached number one both on Amazon.com and the Apple iBooks Store, and by January 8, over one million books had been sold or ordered.

Siege: Trump under Fire
Wolff's book, Siege: Trump Under Fire, was released on June 4, 2019. In it he claims that the Justice Department had drafted indictment documents against Trump in March 2018, accusing him of three criminal counts relating to interfering with a pending investigation and witness tampering. Special Counsel Robert Mueller is reported to have sat on these draft indictments for a year before deciding that Justice Department policy would prevent such an indictment. "The documents described do not exist," Mueller spokesman Peter Carr said, referring to the purported three-count charging document against Trump.

 Nikki Haley controversy 

While being interviewed during Fire and Fury's publicity tour Wolff said he was "absolutely sure" President Trump was having an affair and suggested on two occasions that his partner was Nikki Haley, the United States Ambassador to the United Nations. Haley denied Wolff's allegations, calling them "disgusting". Erik Wemple of The Washington Post said that Wolff was engaging in a "remarkable multimedia slime job". The New York Post editorial board called Wolff's claim an "ugly, sexist rumor". Bari Weiss in The New York Times said that Wolff was "gleefully" spreading "evidence-free detail". On February 25, 2018, Wolff was interviewed by Ben Fordham on the Australian morning show Today, where he was asked about his claim that Trump was having an affair behind Melania Trump's back. Wolff stated that he couldn't hear the question, prompting Fordham to repeat it and eventually asking "you're not hearing me, Mr. Wolff?" to which Wolff replied, "no, I'm not getting anything", before removing his ear piece and walking off the set. Both Fordham and the Today show later tweeted a video that included the audio from the ear piece which revealed that the question could be heard. Days earlier, after being pressed about the rumor in a college press tour interview, Wolff stated "I do not know if the president is having an affair" and added "this is the last thing I say about it".

 Criticism 

The Columbia Journalism Review criticized Wolff in 2010 for suggesting that The New York Times was aggressively covering the breaking News International phone hacking scandal as a way of attacking News Corporation chairman Rupert Murdoch. The Guardian criticized Wolff book Too Famous for the way it portrayed controversial celebrities including Steve Bannon, Jeffrey Epstein, and Christopher Hitchens.

Several people have denied quotes published in Fire and Fury. These people include Tom Barrack, Tony Blair, Katie Walsh, and Anna Wintour.Sean Hannity also denied that he let Donald Trump review questions before interviewing him.

Reporter David Brooks questioned Wolff's credibility since Wolff has been known to not check his facts. Brooks expressed doubts about Wolff's journalistic methods and conveyed skepticism over the accuracy of Fire and Fury.  The View host Meghan McCain criticized Wolff for publishing an off the record conversation with Roger Ailes in Fire and Fury.

Journalist Steven Rattner referred to Wolff as an “unprincipled writer of fiction.”

Alan Dershowitz criticized Wolff's book Siege: Trump Under Fire calling it fiction. Wolff wrote in the book that Dershowitz had a dinner with Donald Trump at the White House to discuss the possibility of representing him. However Dershowitz claimed this dinner never happened.

PolitiFact writer Angie Drobnic Holan noted that Fire and Fury contains several factual errors, including that Trump did not know who John Boehner was in 2016 (Trump had tweeted about Bohener in 2015) and that Wilbur Ross was Trump's choice for  US Secretary of Labor (rather than Secretary of Commerce).

Some questioned Wolff using Sam Nunberg as a source in Fire and Fury'' since Nunberg had admitted to fabricating a story about Chris Christie in the past.

Books

Personal life
Wolff was formerly married to lawyer Alison Anthoine. Wolff and Antoine are parents of three children. He is now married to Victoria Floethe, and they have two children.  

Wolff and Floethe are parents of Louise Wolff, born in 2015.

His daughter, Susanna Wolff, was the editor-in-chief of CollegeHumor.

Wolff is known for his pugnacious personality, and has reportedly been ejected from numerous New York City restaurants.

References

External links

 

Vassar College alumni
Columbia College (New York) alumni
Living people
American male journalists
Writers from Paterson, New Jersey
American columnists
American biographers
20th-century American Jews
1953 births
Montclair Kimberley Academy alumni
New York (magazine) people
Vanity Fair (magazine) people
The Hollywood Reporter people
American male biographers
21st-century American Jews